Oleksandr Borysovych Radchenko (19 July 1976 – 7 February 2023) was a Ukrainian professional footballer who played as a left-back.

Career
Radchenko was born in a present day Mariupol, Ukraine. His career started for Azovets Mariupol in 1993. In 1995, the team became FC Metalurg Mariupol. He then debuted in the Vyscha Liha when he transferred to Dynamo Kyiv in a match versus Torpedo Zaporizhzhia on 9 July 1997. He played there from 1997 to 2003 when he transferred to Dnipro Dnipropetrovsk. Also in 2001, he was loaned to Zakarpatiia Uzhhorod. He played for Dnipro before finishing his career with Kryvbas Kryvyi Rih and Volyn Lutsk.

Radchenko made 17 appearances for the Ukraine national team from 2002 to 2005.

Death
Radchenko died on 7 February 2023, at the age of 46.

References

External links
 Statistics at the UAF website

1976 births
2023 deaths
Sportspeople from Mariupol
Ukrainian footballers
Association football defenders
Ukraine international footballers
Ukraine under-21 international footballers
Ukrainian Premier League players
Ukrainian First League players
Ukrainian Second League players
FC Mariupol players
FC Dynamo Kyiv players
FC Dynamo-2 Kyiv players
FC Dynamo-3 Kyiv players
FC Hoverla Uzhhorod players
FC Dnipro players
FC Kryvbas Kryvyi Rih players
FC Volyn Lutsk players